The  series is a collection of Japanese light novels by Masashi Okita, with illustrations by Unaji. The series started with the release of the first volume in August 2006 titled , and as of January 2011, 12 volumes have been published by ASCII Media Works under their Dengeki Bunko imprint. A manga adaptation by Kurumi Suzushiro started serialization in the April 2010 issue of ASCII Media Works' shōnen manga magazine Dengeki Daioh. A 12-episode anime adaptation by J.C.Staff aired in Japan on AT-X between July 1 and September 16, 2010, and has been licensed and dubbed into English by Funimation Entertainment to be aired on American network television and released to DVD. The English-dubbed version of the anime adaptation was subsequently licensed and distributed by Madman Entertainment and Manga Entertainment to Australia and the United Kingdom, respectively.

Plot
Set in the fictional Otogibana City, Okami-san & her Seven Companions follows the lives of Ryoko Okami (the eponymous Okami-san) and her friends, or companions, throughout their service as members of a "trading" club known as the Otogi High School Bank. At the start of the series, Ryoko and her partner, Ringo, are on a routine service assignment when an unseen stranger assists them. The following day, Ryoko encounters a boy in her class named Ryōshi Morino, a secret admirer of hers, on her way home from school. After being confronted by Ryoko, Ryōshi confesses his love for her and that he had been following her, a confession that is immediately turned down by Ryoko on the basis that he is weak. However, Ryōshi vows that he will become strong enough to be worthy to stand by her side. Later on in the series and with the help of the bank, Ryoko and Ringo discover that Ryōshi was the person who helped them on their service assignment and Ryōshi aids the pair in a fight on another service assignment, thereby prompting Ryoko to accept Ryōshi as someone who she can trust to watch her back. The series progresses in this manner as Ryoko develops romantic feelings for Ryōshi, while also parodying fairy tales such as "Little Red Riding Hood", "The Ant and the Grasshopper", "The Tortoise and the Hare", "Cinderella", "Hansel and Gretel", "The Little Match Girl", and so on.

Characters

Otogi Bank
The main characters are part of a high school club called the Otogi Bank. The bank is an organization which sends its members to solve issues from various students seeking help, who then incur debts that they must repay with favors at the Otogi Bank's discretion. Ryoko is a member of the club, and her seven companions are the other members of the club at the start of the series (Ryoshi joins the club in the first episode but is not one of Ryoko's seven companions).

A tomboyish high school girl who is fierce like a wolf and fights thugs using special Neko Neko Knuckles developed by one of the members of the Otogi Bank, Majolica le Fay. In everyday life, she maintains a strong, dismissive facade to disguise her true self: a kind person that is quite fearful of particular things. Although generally hostile towards Ryōshi due to his cowardice, she accepts him as someone who can watch her back in fights soon after they first fight together. As the series progresses, she develops romantic feelings for Ryōshi, going as far as to dream about him, but continues to treat him roughly. Because of this, Ryoko's character fits into the tsundere category of anime idioms. In addition, she is a close friend of Ringo Akai, whom she met shortly after leaving her junior high and was the first person that she befriended in Otogibana City. When her boyfriend Shirō attempted to rape her, he tricked everyone she knew into thinking that she was the one responsible for it. Unable to convince them of the truth, she left her junior high. Ryoko is based on the wolf from the various fairy tales, such as "Little Red Riding Hood", though on several occasions she is shown to be very different from her base character.

A shy boy who cowers when confronted by other people and so keeps his distance. It is explained in the anime that he suffers from ophthalmophobia, a fear of people staring at him. He has a crush on Ryoko and following a failed confession to her, he is somehow enrolled into Otogi Bank, where the others hope to use his low noticeability to avoid being detected. However, Ryōshi is much braver when hidden in darkness, and fights from afar using a wrist-mounted slingshot armed with pachinko balls with extreme precision, as shown when he knocks a baseball flying in midair about to hit Otsū. He is also known to perform well in fist fights if Ryoko is in danger. He is based on the hunter in the fairytale "Little Red Riding Hood" who captures the wolf or Okami-san.

A petite red-haired girl who has been longtime friends with Ryoko. She is the one who recruits Ryōshi into Otogi Bank. She is a close friend of Ryoko Okami, and is always trying to involve herself with her best friend's love life. Like Ryoko, she tends to smile to hide her true feelings, and admires Ryoko for trying to become stronger. She is based on the Little Red Riding Hood from the folktale of the same name, though some aspects of her scheming, manipulative personality closer resemble the poisoned apple ("Ringo" means apple) of Snow White, a fact which is occasionally referenced by the narrator and other characters. She is also the half sister of "Snow White" Shirayuki Himeno and feels responsible for her past. However, thanks to Ryoko, she moves on from the past. Aiden Foote of THEM Anime Reviews describes her as the "most conniving of all Lolitas and frequently referred to as evil by the dry voiced and witted narrator."

Liszt is the president of Otogi Bank; he is described as clever and laid-back, but resourceful. He sometimes disguises himself and cross-dresses in order to gather information. He is based on the grasshopper in "The Ant and the Grasshopper".

Liszt's cousin and secretary in the club. Does most club paperwork, and is based on the ant in "The Ant and the Grasshopper".

The club's maid who has an obsession for returning favors. When she was young, she was saved from a car accident by a boy who died before she could thank him, resulting in her having a fear of not being able to return a favor. She is based on the crane from the Japanese tale Tsuru no Ongaeshi.

A first-year transfer student who is a year older than the rest of the gang. He acts as a playboy and sometimes flirts with girls although he has a girlfriend, Otohime. He is based on the title character from the Japanese tale Urashima Tarō. It is heavily implied that he is in an intimate relationship with Otohime, and he occasionally enters a "gentleman mode".

A girl with an obsessive crush on Tarō, who cares for her greatly but on some occasions is scared of her. It was thanks to Tarō's motivation that she changed from a chubby bullied elementary student to a thin beauty. Although Tarō often runs from her advances, he does have special feelings for her, and can even be considered her boyfriend. She is based on Princess Otohime from the Japanese tale Urashima Tarō. The reason she is called turtle is because Otohime from the legend was a turtle on land when she met Tarō. Her relationship with Mimi Usami is related to the fable, The Tortoise and the Hare.

Called Majo for short, she is a self-proclaimed mad scientist who builds various devices such as Ryoko's Neko Neko Knuckles. She is based on the sorceress Morgan le Fay. She takes the role of a fairy godmother at times.

Secondary characters

Nicknamed Momo-chan-senpai, she is disciplinary committee member of Otogi High School. She is bisexual and will sometimes make suggestive passes at Ryoko, while using her 'dumplings' to get assistance from naive boys. She is based on the titular character from the Japanese tale Momotarō, and is often accompanied by a trio of students whose names and appearances are based on the Monkey, Dog and Pheasant that accompany Momotaro on his journeys.

She is Ryōshi's aunt. She is a novelist who writes romance stories, using her pen name "Yuki" and just happens to be Ryoko's favorite, and landlady of apartment "Okashisou" where Ryoshi lives. She is based on Japanese tale Yuki-onna.

She is based on the hare from the Aesop's fable "The Tortoise and the Hare". She is Tarō's and Otohime's childhood friend, and since very little she has held hostility towards Otohime, calling her with the mocking nickname of "turtle".

A second year student that requested aide from the Otogi Bank in episode 7, where she went on a double date with Okami and Ryoshi. Afterwards, she occasionally makes appearances. She is based on the Jizō from the Japanese tale Kasajizō.

The principal of Otogi High School, who often requests certain 'services' from the bank in exchange for a lot of the club's more expensive items. He is based on the Genie of the Lamp from Aladdin.

The main antagonist of the series. He is the student council president of Onigashima High School, a school of delinquents intended to conflict with Otogi High School. During middle school, he attempted to rape Ryoko but after that he spread bad rumors about Ryoko. He is based partially on The Boy Who Cried Wolf. However, like other characters, he's drawn from multiple sources; in this case, he is also based on the wolf in sheep's clothing figure. It may be noted that the kanji 狼(Rō) translates as wolf.

She is the half-sister of Ringo. She is based on Snow White. (Shiro means white, Yuki means snow.) Himeno is often seen providing for her seven younger siblings (presumably septuplets) who are based on the Seven Dwarves from the same story.

 A third-year student at Otogi described by the narrator as a "pretty boy." Knowledgeable about Ryōshi and the Otogi Bank, he takes it upon himself to "train" Ryōshi, even taking part in joining Ryōshi and company to Onigashima High School to save Okami because when he was younger, he was saved by Okami from a bunch of delinquents. His hair is shaped into cat ears, and his name, attitude and mannerisms are catlike. He is apparently a skilled fighter who easily overcomes Ryōshi. He is based on Puss in Boots. He is first shown in episode 6 where Ryoko saved him from the delinquents in a flashback. Neko means cat in Japanese.

She is Ryoko, Ringo, and Ryōshi's classmate. She is based on The Little Match Girl. "Machi" in her name, Machiko, sounds like the word match. She appears in the last episode of the anime, attempting to win over Ryoshi. She and her father had been in serious debt, so she had been working towards paying off their debt. Her reason was so she could marry into his family, as she believed he was rather wealthy after seeing him outside his aunt's boarding complex with his "expensive" dogs. Later, when Ryoshi protects her from a group of debt collectors, she begins to really develop a crush on him. She becomes the newest resident of the boarding complex where Ryoshi lives and was able to let go of him after hearing just how much Ryoko meant to him.

In the anime, the narrator tells the tale and regularly makes sarcastic and offensive remarks about the characters at which main characters often break the fourth wall to glare at her.

Media

Light novel

Manga
A manga adaptation, illustrated by Kurumi Suzushiro and titled , was serialized between the April 2010 and October 2012 issues of ASCII Media Works' Dengeki Daioh. The first tankōbon volume was released on September 27, 2010, the fourth volume was released on November 27, 2012.

Anime
The anime series by J.C.Staff, titled , aired from July 2, 2010, to September 17, 2010. At Otakon 2010, North American anime distributor Funimation Entertainment announced that they had acquired the right to the anime and streamed the series on their video portal before releasing the series on home video on April 3, 2012. The series made its North American television debut on September 10, 2012, on the Funimation Channel.

Episode list

References

External links
Anime official website 
Okami-san - The Official Anime Website from

Book series introduced in 2006
2006 Japanese novels
2010 manga
Anime and manga based on light novels
Dengeki Bunko
Dengeki Daioh
Kadokawa Dwango franchises
Funimation
J.C.Staff
Light novels
Madman Entertainment anime
Romantic comedy anime and manga
School life in anime and manga
Shōnen manga